The Svetitskhoveli Cathedral (svet'icxovlis sak'atedro t'adzari; literally the Cathedral of the Living Pillar) is an Orthodox Christian cathedral located in the historic town of Mtskheta, Georgia, to the northwest of the Georgian capital Tbilisi. A masterpiece of the Early and High Middle Ages, Svetitskhoveli is recognized by UNESCO as a World Heritage Site. It is currently the second largest church building in Georgia, after the Holy Trinity Cathedral.

Known as the burial site of the claimed Christ's mantle, Svetitskhoveli has long been one of the principal Georgian Orthodox churches and is among the most venerated places of worship in the region. Throughout the centuries, the cathedral served as the burial place for kings. The present cross-in-square structure was completed between 1010 and 1029 by the medieval Georgian architect Konstantine Arsakisdze, although the site itself dates back to the early fourth century. The exterior archature of the cathedral is a well-preserved example of typical decorations of the 11th century.

Svetitskhoveli is considered an endangered cultural landmark; it has survived a variety of adversities, and many of its priceless frescoes have been lost due to being whitewashed by the Russian Imperial authorities. It is considered one of the four Great Cathedrals of the Georgian Orthodox world.

History

Early history

The original church was built in 4th century AD during the reign of Mirian III of Kartli (Iberia). Saint Nino is said to have chosen the confluence of the Mtkvari (Kura) and Aragvi rivers as the place of the first Georgian church.

According to Georgian hagiography, in the 1st century AD a Georgian Jew from Mtskheta named Elias was in Jerusalem when Jesus was crucified. Elias bought Jesus’ robe from a Roman soldier at Golgotha and brought it back to Georgia. Returning to his native city, he was met by his sister Sidonia who, upon touching the Robe, immediately died from the emotions generated by the sacred object. The Robe could not be removed from her dead hands, so she was buried with it. The place where Sidonia is buried with the Robe is preserved in the cathedral. Later, from her grave grew an enormous cedar tree. Ordering the cedar be chopped down to build the church, St. Nino had seven columns made from it for the foundation. The seventh column, however, had supernatural properties and rose by itself into the air. It returned to earth after St. Nino prayed the whole night. It was further said that from the seventh column flowed a sacred liquid that cured people of all diseases.

In Georgian sveti means "pillar" and tskhoveli means "life-giving" or "living", hence the name of the cathedral. An icon portraying this event can be seen on the third column on the left-hand from the entrance. Reproduced widely throughout Georgia, it shows Sidonia's corpse at the root of a cedar tree stump, with an angel lifting the column towards heaven. Saint Nino is in the foreground: King Mirian and his wife, Queen Nana, are to the right and left. Georgia officially adopted Christianity as its state religion in 337.

Medieval and modern 
Svetitskhoveli Cathedral, originally built in the 4th century, has been damaged several times during history, notably by the invasions of Arabs, Persians and Timurids, and latterly during Russian subjugation and the Soviet period. The building has also been damaged by earthquakes.

The present Svetitskhoveli Cathedral was built between 1010 and 1029 by the architect Arsakidze, at the invitation of the Catholicos Melchizedek I of Georgia. The king of Georgia at that time was Giorgi I (George I).

A notable reconstruction was carried out at the end of 14th century after it was destroyed by Tamerlane. The next large renovation came in the beginning of 15th, when the current dome was built, being subsequently renovated again in the middle of 17th century.

During the restoration of 1970-71 which was presided over by Vakhtang Tsintsadze, the base of the basilica built in the late 5th century by King Vakhtang Gorgasali after St. Nino's original church was found. During the early years of Georgian church building, the basilica was the dominant type of the Georgian church architecture before the crossed-dome style emerged.

The cathedral is surrounded by a defensive wall, built of stone and brick during the reign of King Erekle II (Heraclius) in 1787.

In the beginning of 1830s the cathedral was visited by the Russian Emperor. In connection with this, the portal galleries, surrounding the church from the north, west and south, which had been in unsatisfactory condition, were demolished.

Archaeological expeditions in 1963 found the 11th century house of the Patriarch at the southern part of the wall. Inside the church yard, the remains of the two-story palace of Patriarch Anton II were found.

Architecture

The cathedral is set on a flat lowland, amidst the old town of Mtskheta as its most significant construction, visible from nearly every spot. 

The base of the three-storey basilica, supposed to have been built by Vakhtang Gorgasali after St.Nino's original church, was found by archaeologists during the restoration of 1970–71. Its remnants can be seen in the western and southeastern parts, as well as under the pillars below the floor. The remnants of an even older wooden church were found inside in the southern arm of the cross.

The architecture of the present Svetitskhoveli Cathedral, which dates from around 1020, is based on the cross-dome style of church architecture, which emerged in Georgia in the early Middle Ages and became the principal style after the political unification of Georgia by Bagrat III (978-1014). The characteristic of this style is that the dome is placed across all four sides of the church. There was originally a more harmonic three-step silhouette, with portals from the south, west and north. The northern and southern portals were demolished in the 1830s. The current entrance to the cathedral is from the west.

The structure of the church is intended to ensure good acoustics. Large windows on the dome and walls give a significant amount of light. In its plan the church is a cross with shorter transverse and longer longitudinal arms. The east end has an apse. The dome of Svetitskhoveli was reconstructed several times over the centuries to keep the church in good condition. The current dome is from the 15th century with its upper part reconstructed in the 17th century, when it lost its original size and was reduced in height.

The basic stone used for the cathedral is a sandy yellow with trimmings, while around the apse window a red stone is used. The green stone used in the drum of the cupola is from the 17th century.

The church facades are richly decorated. The curved blind arcading throughout is unaltered from the 11th century. The arches genuinely ascend or descend according to height of the corresponding part of the facade, creating an impression of constant movement. Two high and deep niches of the eastern facade are in clear contrast with surrounding illuminated walls. Each window is surrounded by ornamental stripe and stylised peacock tail-like decorations. Similar decorations are found in the upper parts of the eastern niches. A writing above the windows of eastern facade tell that the church was built by katolikos Melchisedek. Above it, two low-reliefs, an eagle with open wings and a lion under it, are set to the south from the three more recent accessory windows under the roof.

A large window occupies most of the western top side of the church. The decoration shows the Ascension of Jesus, with Christ sitting on the throne and two angels at the both sides. This triangle-shaped decoration fits harmoniously with triangle of the cornice and an arch below it. The original sculpture on the wall has not survived, but was restored several times, most recently in the 19th century.

The architect Arsakidze
A legend surrounds a relief sculpture on the external northern wall.  This shows a right arm and hand holding an L-square - symbol of the stonemason – with an inscription reads:
An inscription on the east façade further attests to the fact that Arsakidze did not live to see his masterpiece finished (in 1029):
{{cquote|
This holy church was built by the hand of Thy wretched servant, Arsakidze.May your soul rest in peace, O Master.}}
Konstantine Gamsakhurdia's novel The Hand of the Great Master relates the legend, for which there is no documentary evidence, that a priest who had also been Arsakidze's patron and teacher was so jealous of Arsakidze's success that he used his influence with the king to have the architect's right hand cut off. According to the novel, King George was also jealous of Arsakidze over his lover, the beautiful Shorena.

Icons and frescoes

The cathedral interior walls were once fully adorned with medieval frescoes, but many of them did not survive. In the 1830s, when Emperor Nicholas I was scheduled to visit Mskheta, Russian authorities razed the galleries and whitewashed timeless frescoes as part of an effort to give the cathedral a "tidier look"; in the end the Czar never even came. Today, after much careful restoration, some frescoes survive, including a 13th-century depiction of the "Beast of the Apocalypse" and figures of the Zodiac.

The walls are decorated with many Christian Orthodox icons,  most of which are not original (the originals being in the national museums of Georgia). The decoration of the church stonework also features carved grapes (as in many churches of Georgia), reflecting the country's ancient wine-making traditions. The large figure of Jesus at the altar was painted by Russian artist in the 19th century. The majority of the icons here date to the 20th century. Some are copies of older icons and frescoes from other churches throughout Georgia.

Two bulls' heads on the east façade, remnants of the 5th-century church, attest to the folk influence on Christian iconography in that early period.

Baptismal font
On the right side from the entrance of the cathedral is a stone baptismal font dating from the 4th century. It is thought to have been used for the baptism of King Mirian and Queen Nana. Immediately behind the font is a reproduction of the relief of Arsakidze's right hand and bevel found on the north facade.

Symbolic copy of the Chapel of Holy Sepulchre

On the south side there is a small stone church built into the cathedral. This is a symbolic copy of the Chapel of Holy Sepulchre in Jerusalem. Built between the end of the 13th and the beginning the 14th centuries, it was erected here to mark Svetitskhoveli as the second most sacred place in the world (after the church of Jerusalem), thanks to Christ's robe. In front of this stone chapel, the most westerly structure aligned with the columns between the aisle and the nave marks Sidonia's grave. Remains of the original life-giving pillar are also here. It was built in the 17th century. Scenes of the lives of King Mirian and Queen Nana, and portraits of the first Christian Byzantine Emperor, Constantine I, and his mother Helena, were painted by G. Gulzhavarashvili at that time. Traces of the foundations of the 4th-century church have been found here.

Throne of Catholicos-Patriarch
The second structure aligned with the columns of the southern aisle was also built in the 17th century as the throne of Catholicos Diasamidze. It no longer serves this function, as current tradition requires a throne for the Georgian patriarch to be in the centre of the church.

Burials in the cathedral

Svetitskhoveli was not only the site of the coronation of the Georgian kings but also served as their burial place. Ten are known to have been buried here, although only six tombs have been found, all before the altar. The tomb of King Vakhtang Gorgasali can be found in the central part of the cathedral and identified by the small candle fortress standing before it. King Erekle II's tomb is identifiable by the sword and shield upon it. His son, George XII was the last king of Georgia and his marble tomb is next to his father's. Also in front of the altar are tombs of David VI, George VIII, Luarsab I and various members of the Bagrationi royal family including Tamar, the first wife of George XI, whose epitaph dating from 1684 is written both in Georgian (Asomtavruli) and Arabic script.

 Other burials 
Domentius IV of Georgia

Other constructions

The cathedral stands in the middle of the large yard, surrounded by high walls with towers, dating back to 18th century. The top storie was designed for military purposes and has gun emplacements. The entrance to the cathedral from the wall is located to the west. The wall has eight towers: six cylindrical and two square. The remnants of a palace and the 11th century two-stories tower above the gate are found in the southwestern part of the yard. The tower is faced by stones, with archature and two bull heads on the west facade, and has a passage with volt on the ground floor. A writing tells that the tower was built by katolikos Melchisedek.

 Threats 
A 2010 UNESCO report has found that structural issues threaten the overall stability of the cathedral.

 Images 

 Notes 

 References 

 Abashidze, Irakli. Ed. Georgian Encyclopedia. Vol. IX. Tbilisi, Georgia: 1985.
 Amiranashvili, Shalva. History of Georgian Art. Khelovneba: Tbilisi, Georgia: 1961.
 Grigol Khantsteli. Chronicles of Georgia. 
 Закарая, П. (1983) Памятники Восточной Грузии. Искусство, Москва, 376 с. (In Russian)
 Rosen, Roger. Georgia: A Sovereign Country of the Caucasus.'' Odyssey Publications: Hong Kong, 1999. 

 Натроев А. Мцхет и его собор Свэти-Цховели. Историко-археологическое описание. 1900

External links 

 Location of Svetitskhoveli Cathedral on the city map of Mtskheta
 Lonely Planet Guide
 Max Planck Institute
 UNESCO site
 

Georgian Orthodox cathedrals in Georgia (country)
Eastern Orthodox church buildings in Georgia (country)
11th-century Eastern Orthodox church buildings
Georgian Orthodox churches in Mtskheta
Tourist attractions in Mtskheta-Mtianeti
World Heritage Sites in Georgia (country)
Burial sites of the House of Mukhrani